MRV Communications is a communications equipment and services company based in Chatsworth, California. Through its business units, the company is a provider of optical communications network infrastructure equipment and services to a broad range of telecom concerns, including multi-national telecommunications operators, local municipalities, MSOs, corporate and consumer high-speed G-Internet service providers, and data storage and cloud computing providers.

MRV Communications was acquired by ADVA Optical Networking on August 14, 2017.

History
MRV was founded in 1988 by Prof. Shlomo Margalit and Dr. Zeev Rav-Noy as a maker of Metro and Access optoelectronic components. MRV’s Metro and Access transceivers enable network equipment to be deployed across large campuses or in municipal and regional networks. To expand its leadership, MRV established LuminentOIC, an independent subsidiary. LuminentOIC makes fiber-to-the-premises (FTTP) components, an activity that was initiated by Rob Goldman, who founded the FTTx business unit in Luminant in 2001.

In the 1990s, MRV produced Ethernet switching and Optical Transport for Metro and campus environments. MRV began building switches and routers used by carriers implementing Metro Ethernet networks that provide Ethernet services to enterprise customers and multi-dwelling residential buildings.

Significant Milestones – Acquisitions, Product Development:
 1992 – Created NBASE Communications through Galcom and Ace acquisitions.
Acquisitions created a networking company with a focus on technology for the Token Ring LAN, IBM Connectivity, and Multi-Platform Network Management for the IBM NetView and HP OpenView platforms. Following the acquisitions, the Company consolidated these operations in Israel with its networking operations in the U.S.
 1996 – Acquired Fibronics from Elbit Ltd.
Enhanced the development of Fast Ethernet and Gigabit Ethernet functions through the acquisitions of the Fibronics GigaHub family of products – Served as the foundation for the OptiSwitch series and other modular optical products. Added valuable product development capability, expanded the range of networking products, and added new marketing and distribution channels and sales in the United States, Israel, and Europe.
 1997 – Acquired Interdata, a French-based system integrator specializing in optical networks, architecture, and network security for operators, enterprises, and large jurisdictions.
 1997-1999 – Very significant OEM activity for Gigabit.
 1998 – Acquired Xyplex - Acquisition enhanced the development of remote management and IP routing functionality for WAN services and added distribution channels in the United States and Europe.
 1998 – 1st WDM deployment in Metro network in Europe – German city carrier network based on Ethernet switching and WDM technologies
 1998 – Invested in Tecnonet SpA, an Italian-based system integrator.
 1999 – Awarded as the prime vendor to deploy the world’s 1st Metro Ethernet national network in Swedish Telecom.
 1999 – Introduced a Linux-based IP router based on network processor technology.
 2001 – Acquired Alcadon AB, a Nordic-based system integrator of passive and active optical networking infrastructure.
 2005 – Introduced the industry's 1st Packet-Optical platform with integrated IP/MPLS/Ethernet and WDM technologies and got MEF CE 1.0 certification (among the 1st ten vendors in the industry).
 2008 – Introduced the industry's 1st purpose-built 10GE demarcation device for Carrier Ethernet Access services.
 2009 – Deployed OptiSwitch Ethernet demarcation in the industry’s 1st 4G LTE commercial Mobile Backhaul network.
 2009 – Introduced one of the lowest-latency optical products (Fiber Driver) for High-Frequency Trading.
 2010 – Introduced industry 1st Physical layer 10G switch for the lab automation market.
 2010 – Announced the divestiture of Source Photonics, Inc. to Francisco Partners.
 2011 – Sets a record for the industry's most efficient WDM solution with power/space/rate.
 2012 – Among the 1st vendors in the industry to pass MEF CE 2.0 certification
 2014 – Introduced a new flagship next-generation WDM metro product line, the OptiDriver series. 
 2015 – Introduced industry 1st 100G purpose-built CE 2.0 NID, OptiPacket.

MRV has been awarded numerous industry accolades for its innovative WDM Optical Networking and Carrier Ethernet product lines from the industry’s top governing bodies and leading research publications and alliances such as MEF, SUPERCOMM, NXTcomm, Frost & Sullivan and others.

MRV leadership

Board of directors
 Ken Traub, Chairman
 Robert Pons, Vice-Chairman
 Mark J. Bonney, Director
 Brian Bellinger, Director
 Jeannie Diefenderfer, Director
 Jeffrey Tuder, Director

Officers
 Mark Bonney, Chief Executive Officer
 Stephen Krulik, Chief Financial Officer

References

External links
 MRV Communications web site

Telecommunications equipment vendors
Photonics companies
Companies based in Los Angeles